This is the list of tourist attractions in Putrajaya, Malaysia.

Convention centers
 Putrajaya International Convention Centre

Memorials
 Millennium Monument
 National Heroes Square
 Putrajaya Landmark

Nature
 Putrajaya Botanical Garden
 Putrajaya Lake
 Putrajaya Wetlands Park

Public squares
 Putra Square

Religious places

Mosques
 Putra Mosque
 Tuanku Mizan Zainal Abidin Mosque

See also
 List of tourist attractions in Malaysia

References

 
Tourism in Malaysia
Putrajaya